Holy Cross City is a ghost town in Eagle County, Colorado. Holy Cross City gets its name from Mount of the Holy Cross, located nearby. Presently, the former townsite is located along Holy Cross City Trail within Holy Cross Wilderness, part of White River National Forest. The Mount is not visible from the townsite.

History

Discovery of valuable deposits of lead, manganese, and trace amounts of gold made the Holy Cross Mining District a densely mined region in the 1880s. The town was populated between 1880 and 1884, with a peak population of 300, though the mines ceased being profitable in 1883. A brief repopulation of the town occurred in the 1890s as the mines were worked for a short time.

At its peak, the city contained a post office, boarding houses, a hotel, as well as other amenities. Only small remnants of the town remain, with four scattered cabins comprising the largest standing structures as of 2017.

The trail–constructed in 1883–remains accessible, but by road is difficult to reach by car due to rocky conditions. The trail is rocky, provides vistas of the Mount of the Holy Cross, and terminates at two lakes.

References

Ghost towns in Colorado
Eagle County, Colorado
1880 establishments in Colorado
Populated places established in 1880